Marian Vasylyovych Shved (born 16 July 1997) is a Ukrainian professional footballer who plays as a right winger for Shakhtar Donetsk.

Club career

Karpaty Lviv
Born in Mykolaiv, Shved is a product of the FC Karpaty Lviv youth system, where he joined at the age of seven.

Shved made his debut for Karpaty in a game against FC Metalurh Donetsk on 1 March 2015 in the Ukrainian Premier League, playing the full 90 minutes of a 1–1 draw in Kyiv's Obolon Arena. On 26 April, he scored his first goals, one in each half of a 4–1 home win over Olimpik Donetsk.

Sevilla
On 5 August 2015, at just the age of 18, Shved signed a five-year contract with Spanish club Sevilla, but was sent to the reserve team  Sevilla Atlético to develop. He turned down fellow Spaniards Valencia CF to sign for the Andalusians, also being attracted by the presence of compatriot Yevhen Konoplyanka in the team.

He played six games for the youth team in the season's UEFA Youth League, scoring the only goal of a win at Juventus in the group stage on 30 September 2015.

On 4 October 2015, Shved made his senior debut for Sevilla Atlético, replacing José Amo for the final eleven minutes of a 1–1 draw at UD Marbella.

Return to Karpaty Lviv
Shved returned to Karpaty Lviv in 2017.

He won the UPL Player of the Month for March 2019 (he also won it earlier in September and November of 2018). Shved finished 2018–19 with 15 goals and four assists in 26 appearances.

Celtic
In January 2019, he signed an 18-month contract with Scottish Premiership club Celtic but remained at Karpaty on loan for the remainder of the season. Shved scored on his Celtic debut in a 2–0 away win (Agg 7–0) over Nõmme Kalju FC in the second qualifying round of the 2019–20 UEFA Champions League coming on as a substitute and scoring in injury time with a powerful strike from the edge of the penalty area.

Mechelen
In July 2021, Shved joined Belgian First Division A club Mechelen on a permanent three-year deal having spent the previous season with the club on loan.

Shakhtar Donetsk
On 1 September 2022, Shved returned to his native Ukraine when he joined Shakhtar Donetsk on a five-year deal. On 6 September, he scored a brace on his Champions League debut in a 4–1 away win over RB Leipzig.

International career
Shved played for Ukraine at under-16 level and has represented the country up to under-19. He made his debut for the senior squad on 20 November 2018 in a friendly against Turkey, as a 77th-minute substitute for Viktor Tsyhankov.

Personal life
Shved is the oldest son of Vasyl Shved, who played as a forward.

Career statistics

Club

Honours

References

External links
 
 Maryan Shved at Topforward
 
 

1997 births
Living people
People from Mykolaiv, Lviv Oblast
Ukrainian footballers
Association football wingers
FC Karpaty Lviv players
Segunda División B players
Sevilla Atlético players
Celtic F.C. players
K.V. Mechelen players
FC Shakhtar Donetsk players
Ukrainian Premier League players
Scottish Professional Football League players
Belgian Pro League players
Ukrainian expatriate footballers
Expatriate footballers in Spain
Ukrainian expatriate sportspeople in Spain
Expatriate footballers in Scotland
Ukrainian expatriate sportspeople in Scotland
Expatriate footballers in Belgium
Ukrainian expatriate sportspeople in Belgium
Ukraine under-21 international footballers
Ukraine international footballers
Sportspeople from Lviv Oblast